Peter Hamilton Raven (born June 13, 1936) is an American botanist and environmentalist, notable as the longtime director, now President Emeritus, of the Missouri Botanical Garden.

Early life 
On June 13, 1936, Raven was born in Shanghai, China to American parents, Walter Francis Raven and Isabelle Marion Breen. His father's uncle Frank Jay Raven was, for a time, one of the wealthiest Americans in China, but was later jailed in a banking scandal. That incident and Japanese aggression in China led the Raven family to return to San Francisco, CA in the late 1930s.

After becoming a member of the California Academy of Sciences while still a youth, Raven went on to graduate with a BSc in biology from the University of California, Berkeley in 1957 and a Ph.D. in botany from the University of California, Los Angeles in 1960.

Career 
After teaching at Stanford University, Raven went on to become Director of the Missouri Botanical Garden in 1971. In 2006, his position was renamed President and Director. Raven announced his plans to retire in 2011, to coincide with his 75th birthday and his 40th year at the Garden. Peter Wyse Jackson was appointed as Raven's successor at the Missouri Botanical Garden in September 2010.

Raven is possibly best known for his work Butterflies and Plants: A Study in Coevolution published in the journal Evolution in 1964 which he coauthored with Paul R. Ehrlich. Since then he has authored numerous scientific and popular papers, many on the evening primrose family, Onagraceae. Raven is also an author of the widely used textbook Biology of Plants, now in its eighth edition, coauthored with Ray F. Evert and Susan E. Eichhorn (both of University of Wisconsin, Madison).

He is a frequent speaker on the need for biodiversity and species conservation.

In 2000, the American Society of Plant Taxonomists established the Peter Raven Award in his honor to be conferred to authors with outstanding contributions to plant taxonomy and "for exceptional efforts at outreach to non-scientists".

He serves on the advisory council of CRDF Global. He served on the board of trustees for Science Service, now known as Society for Science & the Public, from 1993 to 1996.

Research 

Raven has published more than 700 articles, books, and monographs covering topics in Evolution, Taxonomy and Systematics, Biogeography, Coevolution, Plant Conservation, Ethnobotany, and Public Policy, including several text books.

During his early years he was associated with and led Sierra Club outings for several weeks at a time, after which he published "Base Camp Reports."  Published from 1950 to 1956, these reports covered a wide range of subjects, including plant lists, insects, and ecology. His first such report, at the age of 14,  summarized 506 plant collections representing 337 species collected in the Sierra Nevada Mountains in Inyo and Fresno Counties. G. Ledyard Stebbins was a counselor on this particular trip, identified by Raven as Prof. G. L. "Led" Stebbins.

During this time he also published on new weed species and other plants found in and around San Francisco as well as the Sierra Nevada Mountains.

In 1950 Raven, at the age of 14, had collected a plant called C. rubicunda. In the early 1950s, in the course of revising the genus Clarkia Harlan Lewis and his wife Margaret Lewis discovered the herbarium specimen collected by Raven. They visited him in 1952 when he was 16, and wanted to know where the collection was made. Lewis eventually located the new species, and in 1958 Lewis and Raven published a botanical description of this plant, called C. franciscana, which was morphologically very closely related to C. rubicunda and C. amoena.

Evolution 

While a graduate student at the University of California, Los Angeles, Raven and Harlan Lewis published a major paper in 1958 on the evolution of C. franciscana, and generalized to what was by then a general a pattern of speciation in Clarkia. They concluded that C. franciscana had evolved from Clarkia rubicunda; and they asserted that C. franciscana's origin mirrored a recurring theme in Clarkia of a derived species showing a close morphological similarity to a parental species, the derived species being geographically proximal, but differing from the parent by chromosomal differences and showing interspecific sterility.  Further, they hypothesized that such speciation in Clarkia was rapid, and perhaps occurred within the last 12,000 years.

Additionally, they hypothesized that this rapid mode of speciation seen in Clarkia was analogous to a mode of speciation known as quantum evolution.

Following his early publication in 1958 on evolution of C. franciscana, Raven went on to publish many papers on evolutionary topics.  While at Stanford University, with Paul R. Ehrlich, he coined the term coevolution after a 1964 review of butterflies and their food plants.

In a 1969 paper Ehrlich and Raven were also critical of the idea that the definition of species as advocated by Ernst Mayr, Theodosius Dobzhansky, and G. Ledyard Stebbins had very little meaning for plants.

In 1978 Sussman and Raven advanced the idea that nonflying mammals, such as primates and marsupials, could have been significant pollinators but were outcompeted by nectar-feeding birds and bats. Any coevolved relationships between flowering plant species and non-flying mammal pollinators that persist at the present would appear to be "living fossils, which have a great deal to tell us about the evolution of both the mammals, including some of our antecedents, and of the flowering plants."

Raven wrote a review of the plant population data as of 1979, and identified several themes that he felt had potential for future research, including the above theme of the species problem. He went on to assert that developmental biology would be more important in the future He advocated another theme, that being that funding should be provided for study on a few species rather than spread amongst many in order to solve population biology problems:

In 1980 Raven continued discussing problems associated with defining species in plants. He discussed the widespread ability of plant species to hybridize, especially in perennial plants, and the historical observations of such back to 1717. He used as examples of perennial plants in the genera Epilobium, Scaevola, Bidens, and Ceanothus as examples of plants that appeared to use hybridization as a means to adapting to new environments. He stated "If the hybrids are particularly favored in specific ecological situations, asexual reproduction, polyploidy, or simply autogamy may favor the perpetuation of specific genotypes through a narrowing of the spectrum of genetic recombination characteristic of the population. No general conclusions about the most appropriate way to treat these populations taxonomically appear to be possible." In annual plants, using examples from Clarkia, he asserted that several species of Clarkia often occur sympatrically, yet hybrids are very rare in the wild," and that much of the sterility is due to chromosomal repatterning between species."

In 1980 Raven and coauthors reviewed the literature concerning fungal symbiosis in vascular plants. They reviewed two kinds of fungal-plant associations: ectomycorrhizal and endomycorrhizal. They reported that endomycorrhizal fungi, which penetrate plant cells, are found in 80% of all vascular plants, including ferns, gymnosperms, and angiosperms, and are found in forests of high species richness.  On the other hand, ectomycorrhizal fungi, which do not penetrate plant cells, occur in forests of low species richness, are usually in temperate forests, or infertile soils of the tropics. Further, they hypothesized that ectomycorrhizal forests have expanded through the Middle Cretaceous at the expense of endomycorrhizal forests.

Raven's Ph.D. thesis was on a genus within the Onagraceae, and his interest on the evolution of plants within this family as well as the Myrtales runs through his entire career. In 1988 he published a review of the Onagraceae, covering its taxonomy, evolution, cytogenetics, anatomy, breeding systems, and geographic distribution. He asserted that the family was the best known plant family of its size, and proposed that further studies of the family would be useful in understanding of "variation and evolution of plants in the future."

Biogeography 

Raven showed an early interest in plant disjunctions prior to the wide acceptance of plate tectonic theory of the late 1960s, and was an early adopter of plate tectonics in explaining plant disjunctions by the early 1970s.

In 1963 Raven published a review of amphitropical distributions of plant species in North and South America. He divided species into three groups: biopolar or high-latitude species, temperate species, and desert species.

In 1974, with Daniel I. Axelrod, Raven published an extensive article on plant and animal biogeography in the context of plate tectonics. They stated that the new plate tectonic theory "did not require any new modifications of previously established major principles of evolution...however there were new principles of biogeography..."

In 1978, again with Axelrod, they published on the origin and complexity of Californian flora. They reviewed that the flora of California consisted of "northern, temperate elements and xeric, southern elements, and is characterized by a high degree of endemism." They proposed that the reasons for the large number of species in the state as well as the endemics is due to the favorable climate that has prevailed in California for most of the Tertiary, as well as the recent elevation of the Sierra Nevada and other ranges, together with: "The concomitant development of a cold off-shore current which ultimately resulted in the development of a mediterranean, summer-dry climate during the past million years...The endemics of California are a mixture of relicts and newly produced species...and it is the latter that have contributed most to the size of the flora and to the high proportion of endemism in it."

Raven and Axelrod wrote a paper in 1985 on the origin of the Cordilleran flora, a region bounded by the east slope of the Sierra Nevada and Transverse Ranges and Peninsular Ranges of California to the eastern front of the Rocky Mountains, north to the Snake River Plain-western Wyoming, and south to central Arizona-New Mexico.

In 1996 Raven, Axelrod, and Al-Shehbaz wrote a paper on the history of the modern flora of China, Europe, and the continental United States. They said that the three regions have approximately the same geographic area, yet China has two times the number of species as the United States, and three times as many as Europe. They asserted that all three regions had essentially the same flora as of 15 million years ago, but China came to possess the most species because of three reasons. First, China has a tropical rain forest. Second, there is an unbroken gradient of vegetation from the tropical rain forest to "boreal coniferous forests that has persisted and afforded habitats characterized by equable climates during the last 15 million years, when massive extinctions were taking place elsewhere in the Northern Hemisphere...such continuity is interrupted in North America by the Gulf of Mexico and in Europe by the Alps, the Mediterranean, and the Sahara Desert."  The third reason was due to the impact of the Indian subcontinent with Asia starting 50 million years ago, making a "highly dissected, elevated geography."

Taxonomy/Systematics/Floras 

Raven has produced a wide variety of works in the area of plant systematics. Most of them are related to the plant family Onagraceae.  In 1969 he published a 235-page report on Camissonia; In 1976 he, along with his wife at the time Tamara Engelhorn, published a 321-page monograph on Epilobium in Australasia; an embryological analysis of species in the Myrtales; In 1992 a 209-page monograph on the systematics of Epilobium in China; in 1997 a 234-page monograph on the systematics of Oenothera; and in 2007 a 240-page monograph on a reclassification of the Onagraceae. And in 1981 he published a 1,049 page monograph on the systematics of Legumes.

He has also published a number of books (Floras) devoted to the systematics of plants found in particular regions.  These include a 1966 book on the native shrubs of Southern California; a 1966 flora on the Santa Monica Mountains in California; and, with various editors and authors, an ongoing 33 volume set (to date) on the flora of China, organized by plant family.

Ethnobotany 

Raven (along with Dennis E. Breedlove) was a collaborator on a team led by Brent Berlin that published a seminal work on the classification of plants by the Tzeltal Mayan-speaking people of Highland Chiapas. They concluded that plant, as well as animal, descriptions could be grouped into five different hierarchical "taxonomic ethnobiological categories"; these included 1.) "unique beginner," such as plants and animals, 2.) "life form", such as tree, vine, bird, grass, mammal, etc.; 3.) the largest category, consisting usually of ~500 taxa, is "generic", and consists of names such as oak, pine, catfish, perch, and robin.  Further, some "generics" were not included with in the classification of "life forms", and were called "aberrant".  These included names such as cactus, bamboo, pineapple, platypus, etc., and were often of economic value—Agave, bean, and corn as examples. Two other taxa were called "specific" and "varietal," and were generally less numerous. Examples of "specific" include blue spruce, white fir, and post oak, and examples of "varietal" included baby beans, button beans, etc.

Berlin, Breedlove and Raven later extended their analysis of plants and animals to other indigenous peoples including the Hanunoo speaking people of the island of Mindoro, Philippines; the Karam of Papua New Guinea; the Cantonese speaking boat people of Castle Peak Bay, Hong Kong; the Navajo of the Southwestern United States; the Fore people of Papua New Guinea; the Guaraní people of South America; and the Nahuatl speaking people of Mexico, and concluded that their five to six taxonomic ethnobiological categories were generalizable.

Awards and honors 
 American Society of Plant Biologists Leadership in Science Public Service Award, 2012
 William L. Brown Award for Excellence in Genetic Resource Conservation, 2010
 Arthur Hoyt Scott Medal 2009, awarded by the Scott Arboretum of Swarthmore College
 ANZAAS Medal, 2004
 International Cosmos Prize, 2003
 Veitch Memorial Medal, 2003 
 U.S. National Medal of Science recipient, 2000
 Golden Plate Award of the American Academy of Achievement, 2000
 Induction into the St. Louis Walk of Fame, 1995
 Tyler Prize for Environmental Achievement, 1994
 Volvo Environment Prize winner, 1992
 The Delmer S. Fahrney Medal in 1989
 Member of the American Philosophical Society, 1988
 International Prize for Biology winner, 1986
 Catharine T. MacArthur Foundation Fellowship, 1985
 Member of the United States National Academy of Sciences, 1977
 Member of the American Academy of Arts and Sciences, 1977
 Foreign Member of the Linnean Society of London (FMLS)
 Honorary Member of the American Society of Landscape Architects
 Elected as a Corresponding Fellow to the Australian Academy of Science
 Member of President Bill Clinton's Committee of Advisors on Science and Technology
 Former Home Secretary of the U.S. National Academy of Sciences
 Former President of Sigma Xi
 Engler Medal winner
 Former President of the American Association for the Advancement of Science
 Named a Hero for the Planet by TIME magazine
 Member of National Geographic Society board of trustees
 Honorary Doctor of Science Harvard University  May 29, 2014
Megacorax is a genus of flowering plants from Mexico, belonging to the family Onagraceae was published in his honour, in 2002.
the lichen species Ocellularia raveniana was named in his honour

Works 
 Paul R. Ehrlich and Peter H. Raven (1964), "Butterflies and Plants:  A Study in Coevolution", Evolution, 18: 586–608.
 Peter H. Raven and Helena Curtis (1970), Biology of Plants, New York:  Worth Publishing.  [Early presentation of five-kingdom system.]

References 

 Raven page at MOBOT
 Raven page at Washington University
 Bio at National Geographic
 1999 story at time.com
PETER AND THE WOLF. Why Missouri Botanical Garden's Peter Raven, world-renowned environmentalist, courts Monsanto's favor, boosts its biotech and takes its money Riverfront Times, 3 November 1999, retrieved 27 October 2015

External links 
Sullivan, R. & J. Eaton. Peter Raven's botanical roots come from S.F. San Francisco Chronicle August 20, 2008.
Profile on the International Cosmos Prize website

American environmentalists
American nonprofit executives
1936 births
Living people
MacArthur Fellows
Missouri Botanical Garden directors
National Medal of Science laureates
Botanical Society of America
Fellows of the Linnean Society of London
Fellows of the Australian Academy of Science
Foreign Members of the Royal Society
Foreign members of the Chinese Academy of Sciences
Foreign Fellows of the Indian National Science Academy
Foreign Members of the Russian Academy of Sciences
Foreign Members of the USSR Academy of Sciences
Members of the United States National Academy of Sciences
Members of the Pontifical Academy of Sciences
Scientists from California
Scientists from St. Louis
Stanford University faculty
University of California, Berkeley alumni
University of California, Los Angeles alumni
Veitch Memorial Medal recipients
Washington University in St. Louis faculty
20th-century American botanists
21st-century American botanists
Fellows of the Ecological Society of America
Members of the Royal Swedish Academy of Sciences